Fredrick A. "Fred" Hudson (5 December 1863 in Winnipeg, Manitoba, Canada-7 May 1932) was the manager of the Kenora Thistles for both the challenge for the Stanley Cup in 1905 (losing to Ottawa) and for of their 1907 Stanley Cup championship.

1863 births
1932 deaths
Stanley Cup champions